William, Bill, Billy or Willie Slater may refer to:
 William Slater (architect) (1819–1872), English architect
 William Slater (cricketer) (1790–1852), English cricketer
 William Slater (swimmer) (born 1940), Canadian swimmer
 William A. Slater (1857–1919), American businessman, art collector, and philanthropist
 Bill Slater (broadcaster) (1902–1965), American educator, sports announcer, and radio/television personality
 Bill Slater (footballer) (1927–2018), English footballer
 Bill Slater (politician) (1890–1960), Australian lawyer, politician and diplomat
 Billy Slater (born 1983), Australian rugby league footballer
 Billy Slater (footballer) (1858–?), English footballer 
 Willie J. Slater, American football coach and player
 Edward Slater (1917–2016), also known as Bill Slater, Australian biochemist